Marcus Acilius Glabrio may refer to:

*Marcus Acilius Glabrio (suffect consul 33 BC), Roman politician
Marcus Acilius Glabrio (consul 256), Roman politician